MetaStock is a proprietary computer program originally released by Computer Asset Management in 1985. It is used for charting and technical analysis of stock (and other asset) prices. It has both real-time and end-of-day versions. MetaStock is a product of Innovative Market Analysis.

Early history
In 1982 Steve Achelis started a company named Computer Asset Management to develop financial and technical analysis software for personal computers.  Computer Asset Management was renamed Equis International in 1989.  Achelis’ first software application, written for the Apple II+, was The Financial Package which calculated various financial planning metrics.  The Market Mood Monitor was released in 1984 and was eventually renamed The Technician.  The Technician, written for the IBM PC, helped investors analyze and chart broad market conditions using sentiment, momentum, and monetary indicators.  MetaStock 1.0 was released in 1986.  Both MetaStock and The Technician received PC Magazine’s Editor’s Choice award in April 1986.

While The Technician analyzed broad market conditions, MetaStock analyzed individual securities (stocks, futures, mutual funds, etc.). In response to the increasing demand for real-time analysis of prices, MetaStock RT was released in July 1992.  MetaStock RT received live, real-time quotes from Data Broadcasting’s Signal data feed. In 1995, MetaStock 5.0 was released for the Microsoft Windows 3.1 operating system.  Later that year, MetaStock added support for the Reuters DataLink end-of-day data feed.  This relationship with Reuters led to Reuters purchasing Equis International and its MetaStock software in 1996.  In 1998, MetaStock was released for the Reuters Quotron data feed and in 2001 for the Reuters 3000 Xtra electronic trading platform. In June 2013, Thomson Reuters sold MetaStock to Innovative Market Analysis.

Versions

References

External links 
MetaStock official website

Technical analysis software